The Ostrobothnian Chamber Orchestra (Finnish: Keski-Pohjanmaan Kamariorkesteri) is an ensemble based in Kokkola, Western Finland. When configured as a larger symphony orchestra, reinforced with local musicians, the orchestra is referred to as the Kokkola Orchestra.

The Organisation

The Ostrobothnian Chamber Orchestra was founded by Juha Kangas in 1972. The Ostrobothnian Chamber Orchestra performs regularly at home and abroad, with foreign tours to Japan and other European countries, including the Mozart Festival in Würzburg. The Orchestra performs music from the Baroque to the present. The orchestra has done important work as an ambassador of contemporary Finnish music. The collaboration with the composer Pehr Henrik Nordgren (1944–2008) between 1973 and his death was exceptionally fruitful. Nordgren wrote 22 works for the Orchestra, including his String Quartets 5–8 for the Kokkola Quartet made up of members of the Orchestra, and two works for the Kokkola Orchestra.

In the autumn of 2018, the orchestra began a series of concerts featuring all Beethoven's nine symphonies. The concert series will end in 2020, when Kokkola will celebrate its 400th anniversary, and it will also be 250 years since Beethoven's birth. The orchestra will be joined by the Tapiola Sinfonietta for the ninth symphony for the series's conclusion. Conductors have included Sakari Oramo, Klaus Mäkelä, John Storgårds and Juha Kangas.

Juha Kangas led the orchestra until the end of 2008 and was one of the four conductors of the orchestra in 2009–2013, including Sakari Oramo, Tuomas Hannikainen and Johannes Gustavsson. In autumn 2013, Sakari Oramo started as an artistic director of the orchestra. The concert master is Reijo Tunkkari.

Juha Kangas is still an honorary conductor of orchestra.

References

Finnish orchestras
Musical groups established in 1973
Kokkola